James Webb Young (1886-1973) was an American advertising executive at J. Walter Thompson who became First Chairman of The Advertising Council.

He was inducted in the American Advertising Federation Hall of Fame.

Young received many honors and awards including the Advertising Man of the Year Award in 1946.

Bibliography

References

1973 deaths
1886 births
20th-century American businesspeople
American advertising executives